Loreto Convent School is a girls' school in Delhi, India. Situated in Delhi Cantt, the school is an English medium school affiliated to CBSE boards of Delhi, and run by Loreto Educational Society (Loreto Nuns), associated with Sisters of Loreto, a Roman Catholic dominion founded in 1609. It was first established in January 1965 at 28, Mall Road, with Mother Francis Clare as the Founder Principal, it later shifted to its present location in July 1966.

Loreto Convent

Loreto Convent, Delhi is an all-female Christian school. The school comes under the Loreto Educational Society in India, which runs and controls it. It stems out of the Loreto community which belongs to the Institute of the Blessed Virgin Mary commonly known as Loreto Sisters, founded internationally by English nun, at Saint-Omer in northern France.  It is an English medium school situated in New Delhi cantt. It is affiliated to CBSE board. The school was started by sisters known as Loreto sisters who belong to the Institute of the Blessed Virgin Mary (I.B.V.M.) . IBVM was first founded by a nun Mary Ward in England in 1609 and later, Mother Teresa Ball took it to Ireland.  Ten Loreto sisters came from Ireland to Calcutta to open the first Loreto convent in India in 1842. 

Loreto, Delhi is one of the 17 schools in India. There are 119 Loreto schools in 12 countries and on 6 continents. The current principal of the school is Sr. Monica Rozario and there are 3 coordinators each for junior, middle and senior school. The school celebrated its golden jubilee in 2014 (50 years). Each junior school class has 2 sections and rest all classes have 3 sections.

Education system
Loreto Convent is an all girls English medium school affiliated to Central Board of Secondary Education(CBSE). It has a junior school starting from nursery till class IV and senior school from class four onwards till class twelve. After school hours it also provides education to poor girls residing in the nearby areas.  Various subjects like Physics, Chemistry, Mathematics, Sociology, Political Science, Biology, Accountancy, Economics, Business Studies, and Information Technology are taught in the school. Now there are 3 streams in the school giving children a better environment for studies - humanities, science and commerce.

House activities
There are four houses:

Various intra-school sports competitions are held, such as basketball, volleyball, kho-kho, badminton, cricket, and table-tennis. Other events include drawing competitions, creative writing competitions, general knowledge quizzes, extempores, declamations and debate competitions.

Campus
The school is situated in Delhi Cantt. The school building is huge and is painted in a pink colour. It has all the basic infrastructure like chemistry, biology and physics labs, computer lab, AV room, basketball and volleyball ground. It also has a vast land area where drill and march past is conducted. It is an environment friendly, no-polybag and no-aluminium foil zone.

Excursions
The school has taken children for outward-bound trips to places like Manali, Shimla, Egypt, Switzerland, Jaipur, Jim Corbett National Park, Kolkata, Mount Abu, Udaipur, Goa and Italy.

See also
 List of Loreto Colleges and schools
 List of Christian Schools in India

References

External links
Official website
 Loreto Convent School, Delhi at wikimapia

Delhi
Catholic secondary schools in India
Christian schools in Delhi
Girls' schools in Delhi
Educational institutions established in 1965
1965 establishments in Delhi